The 2003 Cork Junior A Football Championship was the 105th staging of the Cork Junior A Football Championship since its establishment by the Cork County Board. The draw for the opening fixtures took place on 8 December 2002. The championship ran from 12 October to 30 November 2003.

The final was played on 30 November 2003 at Páirc Uí Chaoimh in Cork, between Carbery Rangers and Cill na Martra, in what was their first ever meeting in the final. Carbery Rangers won the match by 0-10 to 0-05 to claim their first ever championship title.

Cill na Martra's Richard Hoare was the championship's top scorer with 1-136.

Qualification

Results

Quarter-finals

Semi-finals

Final

Championship statistics

Top scorers

Overall

In a single game

References

2003 in Irish sport
Cork Junior Football Championship